The mutiny and mass murder on Lurongyu 2682 (鲁荣渔2682号), a Chinese squid-jigging trawler, took place in the South Pacific Ocean between June and July 2011. A group of crewmen from the ship, led by Liu Guiduo, seized control of the ship from their captain. Of the 33 men on board, 16 were killed and 6 jumped overboard (and are presumed dead). The captain cooperated with the hijackers in the later stage of the mutiny when they convinced him to sail and illegally emigrate to Japan.

Eleven crew members returned to China. In 2013, these crew members were convicted of murder, with five receiving death sentences, including the captain. An interview with the first of the convicted crew to be released went viral, and the events have been adapted into a radio drama and a visual novel.

Background

Ship and crew
Lurongyu 2682 is the generic name of the fishing vessel, registered in Rongcheng, Shandong. It was owned by Shandong Rongcheng Xinfa Seafood Corporation (Chinese: 山东荣成市鑫发水产公司).

There were 33 crewmen on board, split across three social groups. These groups were from the province of Heilongjiang, the region of Inner Mongolia, and the management team from the city of Dalian. Only some of the crew were licensed seafarers. They boarded the ship and passed the customs check normally, while unlicensed seafarers boarded another small boat to avoid the custom check, and transferred to Lurongyu 2682 at sea.

The working contract between the sailors and the operating company stated that the ship would return to China after two years. However, the stamp that the company used in the contract was forged, making all of the sailors undocumented employees.

Initial voyage and discontent

On 27 December 2010, the Lurongyu 2682 departed from Port Shidao (石島), located in Rongcheng City, Shandong Province, China, for squid jigging. The ship arrived in the Peru Sea in February 2011 and began jigging operations. The crew complained about the working environment and by May 2011 they became discontent and suspicious about the company. They assumed that the company would violate the contract by deducting their salaries. Liu Guiduo expressed his concern to Captain Li Chengquan and requested that they immediately return to China. Li refused to do so.

Mutiny

On 16 June 2011, while the ship was in the Chile Sea, Liu led a group of 11 crewmen to hijack the ship. They forced their way into the captain's cabin and beat Li with a stick. Chief Cook Xia Qiyong heard the disturbance and rushed to Li's cabin with a kitchen knife, and was killed by the mutineers. The crew did not believe that there would be another killing and decided to claim that Xia had fallen into the sea by himself.

The mutineers forced Li to sail back to China, keeping him under watch. Concerned about further interference and acts of revenge for Xia's killing, they disabled the ship's communications and locked all knives, lifeboats and life jackets. Several weeks passed quietly: the ship rounded Hawaii and was a couple weeks from China. Liu was then informed that the ship was consuming fuel at an abnormally high rate and that the auxiliary engines had failed. Crewman Bo Fujin told Liu that Chief Engineer Wen Dou and others who were personally close to Li were planning a revolt, and asked Liu to spare them.

On 20 July 2011, Liu ordered the mutineers to kill all the crewmen who he believed were trying to revolt. Under the cover of loud music, they killed nine men, stabbing them on the ship's deck and throwing their bodies into the sea. The victims included Bo, as Liu was uncertain of his loyalty. Liu personally killed the second mate, and made certain that each of the mutineers had taken part in a murder.

Liu decided not to return to China. He told the mutineers that they would instead illegally immigrate to Japan. To facilitate this, Liu forced some of the crew to call their families by satellite phone to transfer money. He said that the other crew members could return to China, and that he did not care if they testified against him. Nonetheless, there was great unease and suspicion following the mass killing. The following day, crewman Ma Yuchao was missing, and was believed to have jumped into the sea due to the atmosphere of terror.

Bao De, the leader of a close group of six mutineers who were from Inner Mongolia, felt that the killings would continue and that only those closest to Liu would be spared. He planned to revolt against Liu, but Liu learned of this. Liu convinced Li to join the mutineers and to avenge his murdered friends by killing Bao. Bao shouted for help but none of his allies responded. That night, Bao's five men were systematically murdered.

The following morning, the ship's engine room was found to be flooded and the second engineer, Wang Yanlong, was missing. It was presumed that Wang jumped into the sea after sabotaging the ship. Liu had the lifeboats unlocked and prepared and Liu and Li repaired the communication equipment to send an SOS signal. During this activity, the first officer and three crewmen escaped in a lifeboat. The ship was adrift but a sea anchor allowed it to intercept the lifeboat in the current. The mutineers threw squid hooks, destroying the lifeboat and injuring those on it. Three of the men swam away while another begged for his life. Liu had this man rescued and then ordered his murder by the last two of the crew who had not yet killed anyone.

Following this, there were eleven crew alive on the ship, each of whom had killed. Liu told them to blame the killings on Bao and his men, and to say that the killers escaped with a lifeboat. To ensure their cooperation, Liu threatened harm to their families, whose addresses he had obtained from the ship's records. A rescue team from the China Coast Guard, which had received the distress signal, arrived after a few days and towed the ship back to China.

Legal proceedings
All eleven surviving crewmembers were detained by police when they returned to Shidao on 12 August 2011. They initially followed Liu Guiduo's instructions, denied any killing, and blamed the deaths on Bao De and his friends. Later, all except Liu Guiduo confessed.

On 19 March 2013, a court in Weihai City, Shandong Province, announced the sentence of the eleven convicted, as follows:

Liu Guiduo, Jiang Xiaolong, Liu Chengjian, and Huang Jinbo were found guilty of murder and ship hijacking and sentenced to death.
Li Chengquan was found guilty of murder and sentenced to death;
Wang Peng was found guilty of murder and of ship hijacking, with a combined sentence of death, with 2 years probation.
Feng Xingyan was found guilty of murder and sentenced to life in prison;
Mei Linsheng and Cui Yong were found guilty of murder and sentenced to 15 years in prison;
Xiang Lishan was found guilty of murder and theft, with a combined sentence was 5 years in prison and a 10,000 RMB penalty.
Duan Zhifang was found guilty of murder and sentenced to 4 years in prison.

On 23 March 2017, the Supreme Court of China authorized the death penalty of Liu Guiduo, Jiang Xiaolong, Liu Chengjian, Huang Jinbo, Li Chengquan, and Wang Peng.

Reaction
Families of most deceased crew members received compensation from Xinfa. The government promised to strengthen regulations and enforcement regarding fishing safety, training, and labour disputes.

One anonymous crewmate, once released, was interviewed by a reporter named Du Qiang. His account of the mutiny was published as a 17,000 character story in January 2016, and was later translated into English by Nicky Harman and Emily Jones. It became an Internet hit that attracted 30 million views and 100,000 comments on Sina Weibo. A monograph, based on a separate interview with the released crewman, was written by a legal journalist and published in August 2016.

On 25 October 2018, the events were loosely adapted into a visual novel titled One-Way Ticket and released on Steam by the Chinese indie game company Zodiac Interactive. For marketing purposes, the plot and the characters were designed to be Japanese, causing a reaction in Japan.

References

Bibliography
Monograph
 (The author is a legal journalist, the former senior reporter of Southern Weekly and former executive chief editor of Legal Weekly.)

2011 crimes in China
2011 murders in Oceania
21st-century executions by China
History of the Pacific Ocean
June 2011 crimes
July 2011 crimes
Maritime incidents in 2011
Maritime incidents in China
Mass murder in 2011
21st-century mass murder in China
Mutinies